Gardella Racing is a sport compact racing team founded in 2001 by Howell, New Jersey native Gary Gardella.

Gardella started racing on a drag race, at Englishtown Raceway Park. He then started moving into chassis, engine and motor program modifications.

In the beginning, all team members were voluntary. Some of those early team members included, Jon Perry, Jason Smith and Kemel Campbell.  After several successes, Gardella was able to hire a full-time crew chief, Jon Perry.

Gardella Racing has been involved in sport compact racing, drifting and Road Racing.

Drag Racing History
NHRA Sport Compact Drag Racing and NDRA racing were the pinnacle for the grassroots drag racer in the 2000s.

Gardella made his debut in the NHRA Sport Compact Drag Racing Series in 2001. He qualified sixth and faced Angela Proudfoot, with crew chief Chris Neidemire, in the first round.  This was his first-ever NHRA elimination-round win.

In 2002, Gardella ran and qualified at all five NHRA races he competed at.  At the end of the season he finished eight in the final point standings.
Running in the Hot Rod category Gardella raced at nine events and earned his first two career wins.  His first win, that earned him the coveted NHRA Wally trophy, came at Gainesville Raceway, and the second win was in Englishtown.  At the same event in Englishtown Gardella ran the first ever 8.4 second 180-mph run in the Hot Rod category.  Overall he finished third in the driver standings.

In 2004 Gardella Racing ran in both NHRA Sport Compact Racing and NDRA.  He continued his wins with one in NHRA at Atco, NJ.  He finished second in both NHRA and NDRA series'.

Three wins in 2005 vaulted Gardella to the runner-up position in NHRA Sport Compact Drag Racing.  He won at Atco Raceway, Bandimere Speedway and Moroso Motorsports Park.  Gardella also finished the NDRA as season champion in Pro 4 Cylinder.  Overall he finished the two series' events with 14 wins in 16 final-round appearances.

A jump to Pro FWD happened in 2006 for Gardella Racing.  GM jumped on board with factory support on a new Chevy Cobalt.  The car was powerful and consistent, but Gardella could not repeat the success of the 2005 season.  He had one runner-up finish at Atco Speedway.

In 2007 he entered the season with a brand-new purpose-built full-tube chassis racecar.  GM continued their support, and a new title sponsor came on board: Red Bull.  After a disappointing first-half of the NHRA season, Gardella came back strongly in the second half and won the season championship in Pro FWD.  With the championship in hand, Gardella added to the honors by being named "Driver of the Year" by UrbanRacer.com.

The sport compact drag racing world lost the Pro FWD category after the 2008 season.

In 2008, Gardella Racing tried the 1/8-mile racing of ADRL series. The rear wheel-drive race cars were no match for the Gardella Racing FWD Cobalt.

A New Era of Grassroots Racing:  Drifting
Not one to sit around and not compete, Gardella and his Gardella Racing team sought out the world of drifting.  Formula DRIFT was the place to go drifting in the United States.

For the 2008 season, Gardella debuted a Pontiac Solstice GXP.  Joining the Gardella Racing family was Ryan Tuerck. Competing in all Formula DRIFT events across the country, the team with Tuerck leading the drive finished on the podium in Atlanta and sixth overall in the point standings. Tuerck was also able to take home the title of “Driver of the Year!”

Gardella Racing showed its flair for motorsports power by finishing with two wins (Long Beach and Irwindale) in 2009.  This propelled Tuerck to finish second in the season ending standings.  He was a mere 6-points behind the winner Chris Forsberg.

2010 finds Gardella Racing enjoying corporate sponsorship.  Joining the team is Mobil 1 as primary sponsor on the Solstice.  Also, Tuerck joined the elite crowd of Red Bull athletes earlier in the year.

New Beginnings
Gardella racing introduced a driver development program in 2010.  Steve Angerman joined the Gardella Racing driver stable.  His first and foremost position with the team is to be the primary spotter for Tuerck at Formula DRIFT events.  While not fulfilling those responsibilities, Angerman will be driving a second Pontiac Solstice at East Coast grass root events such as Club Loose, Drift Nirvana and a few more with the help of Gardella Racing.  In addition, he will compete at some Pro-Am events in the seat of the Gardella Racing Solstice that is powered by an LS7.  When not running in either of those circuits, Angerman will compete in a few local NASA events, SCCA events, endurance road races co-driving with Tuerck and possibly some karting events.

References 
  New York Times 
 NASDAQ 
 Bloomberg BusinessWeek 
 Euro Investor 
Pontiac Solstice Pontiac Solstice 
Red Bull Drifting World Championship Red Bull Drifting World Championship 
 GM Tuner Source 
 Mobil 1 Joins Gardella Racing As Primary Sponsor 
 Gardella Racing's Ryan Tuerck Signed To Red Bull Athlete Program

External links 
   Gardella Racing
    Mobil 1
   Formula Drift
  Yo Parts
  Ryan Tuerck

American auto racing teams